Naomi Yashiro (矢代直美, born 30 December 1977) is a Japanese former basketball player who competed in the 2004 Summer Olympics. She has been working as a cabin crew at the Japan Airlines and joined its team JAL Rabbits.

Profile
Yashiro was selected for 1999 Universiade while she was an undergraduate at Nippon Sport Science University (4th). Entered Japan Airlines as a cabin crew in 2000, then joined their basketball team JAL Rabbits to become the Rookie of the Year at the second W League of the Women's Japan Basketball League, contributing to the team's third rank. Yashiro was the women's free throw champion in the season of 2002-'03.

Competed in the 2002 FIBA World Championship for Women (13th), 2004 Summer Olympics and 2007 FIBA Asia Championship for Women (3rd, Level 1.) Yashiro was appointed as a playing assistant coach from 2009-'10 Women's Regular League, W League for her team, and retired in 2011 when the team was dismissed. She has worked full-time as a cabin crew.

Notes

References

Further reading 
 
 

1977 births
Living people
Japanese women's basketball players
Olympic basketball players of Japan
Basketball players at the 2004 Summer Olympics
Basketball players at the 2002 Asian Games
Asian Games competitors for Japan